PlanetMath is a free, collaborative, mathematics online encyclopedia. The emphasis is on rigour, openness, pedagogy, real-time content, interlinked content, and also  community of about 24,000 people with various maths interests. Intended to be comprehensive, the project is currently hosted by the University of Waterloo. The site is owned by a US-based nonprofit corporation, "PlanetMath.org, Ltd".

PlanetMath was started when the popular free online mathematics encyclopedia MathWorld was temporarily taken offline for 12 months by a court injunction as a result of the CRC Press lawsuit against the Wolfram Research company and its employee (and MathWorld's author) Eric Weisstein.

Materials

The main PlanetMath focus is on encyclopedic entries. It formerly operated a self-hosted forum, but now encourages discussion via Gitter.

, the encyclopedia hosted about 9,289 entries and over 16,258 concepts (a concept may be for example a specific notion defined within a more general entry). An overview of the current PlanetMath contents is also available. About 300 Wikipedia entries incorporate text from PlanetMath articles; they are listed in :Category:Wikipedia articles incorporating text from PlanetMath.

An all-inclusive PlanetMath Free Encyclopedia book of 2,300 pages is available for the encyclopedia contents up to 2006 as a free download PDF file.

Content development model

PlanetMath implements a specific content creation system called authority model.

An author who starts a new article becomes its owner, that is the only person authorized to edit that article.  Other users may add corrections and discuss improvements but the resulting modifications of the article, if any, are always made by the owner.  However, if there are long lasting unresolved corrections, the ownership can be removed. More precisely, after 2 weeks the system starts to remind the owner by mail; at 6 weeks any user can "adopt" the article; at 8 weeks the ownership of the entry is completely removed (and such an entry is called "orphaned").

To make the development more smooth, the owner may also choose to grant editing rights to other individuals or groups.

The user can explicitly create links to other articles, and the system also automatically turns certain words into  links to the defining articles. The topic area of every article is classified by the Mathematics Subject Classification (MSC) of the American Mathematical Society (AMS).

The site is supervised by the Content Committee. Its basic mission is to  maintain the integrity and quality of the mathematical content and organization of PlanetMath. As defined in its Charter, the tasks of the Committee include:
 Developing/maintaining the standards for PlanetMath content
 Improving individual PlanetMath entries in its Encyclopedia, Book, Paper, and Exposition)
 Developing topic areas
 Developing/improving site and user documentation
 Managing the PlanetMath Request list and Unproved Theorems list
 Improving categorization and other meta-attributes of entries.
 Developing software recommendations for improved content authoring and editorial functions.

Technical details
PlanetMath content is licensed under the copyleft Creative Commons Attribution/Share-Alike License.
All content is written in LaTeX, a typesetting system popular among mathematicians because of its support of the technical needs of mathematical typesetting and its high-quality output.

The software running PlanetMath is written in Perl and runs on Linux and the web server Apache. It is known as Noösphere and has been released under the free BSD License. As of March 13, 2013 PlanetMath has retired Noösphere and runs now on a software called Planetary, which itself was implemented with Drupal.

Related projects
Encyclopedic content and bibliographic materials related to physics, mathematics and mathematical physics are developed by PlanetPhysics. The site, launched in 2005, uses similar software (Noosphere), but a significantly different moderation model with emphasis on current research in physics and peer review. Additionally, a PlanetComputing project is envisaged that would also include computational physics and AI together with logical, categorical, ontological and mathematical foundations of computers and automata.

See also
 arXiv
 CogPrints
 List of online encyclopedias
 MathWorld
 MathOverflow

References

External links
 
 
 
  
 
 
 
 

Mathematics websites
Online encyclopedias
Wiki communities
Canadian online encyclopedias